Tiangong, officially the Tiangong space station, is a permanently crewed space station constructed by China and operated by China Manned Space Agency (CMSA) in low Earth orbit between  above the surface. It is China's first long-term space station, part of the Tiangong program and the core of the "Third Step" of the China Manned Space Program (CMS); it has a pressurised volume of 340 m³ (12,000 cu ft), slightly over one third the size of the International Space Station.

The construction of the station is based on the experience gained from its precursors, Tiangong-1 and Tiangong-2. The first module, the Tianhe ("Harmony of the Heavens") core module, was launched on 29 April 2021, followed by multiple crewed and uncrewed missions and two more laboratory cabin modules Wentian ("Quest for the Heavens") launched on 24 July 2022 and Mengtian ("Dreaming of the Heavens") launched on 31 October 2022. The station aims to provide opportunities for space-based experiments, build capacity for scientific and technological innovation.

 Nomenclature 
The names used in the space program, previously all chosen from the revolutionary history of the People's Republic, have been replaced with mystical-religious ones. Thus, the new Long March launch vehicles were renamed Divine Arrow, space capsule Divine Vessel (神舟), spaceplane Divine Dragon (神龙), land-based high-power laser Divine Light (神光), and supercomputer Divine Might (神威).

These poetic names continue as the first, second, third, fourth, fifth and future Chinese Lunar probes are called Chang'e after the Moon goddess. The name "Tiangong" means "heavenly palace". Across China, the launch of Tiangong-1 was reported to have inspired a variety of feelings, including love poetry. The rendezvous of the space vehicles has been compared to the reunion of the cowherd and the weaver girl.

Wang Wenbao, director of the CMSA, told a news conference in 2011: "Considering past achievements and the bright future, we feel the manned space programme should have a more vivid symbol, and that the future space station should carry a resounding and encouraging name. We now feel that the public should be involved in the names and symbols, as this major project will enhance national prestige and strengthen the national sense of cohesion and pride".

On 31 October 2013, CMSA announced the new names for the whole space station program:
 The precursor space labs would be called Tiangong, code TG.  Tiangong-1 and Tiangong-2 were launched respectively in 2011 and 2016.
 The large modular space station would be called Tiangong as well, without number.
 The cargo transport spacecraft would be called Tianzhou, code TZ. The first Tianzhou mission successfully launched and deorbited in 2017. The first mission to the space station, Tianzhou 2, flew on 29 May 2021. Subsequently, Tianzhou 3, Tianzhou 4 and Tianzhou 5 were launched respectively on 20 September 2021, 9 May 2022 and 12 November 2022. 
 The Modular Space Station Core Module would be called Tianhe, code TH. Tianhe was successfully launched on 29 April 2021.
 The Modular Space Station Experiment Module I would be called Wentian, code WT. Wentian was successfully launched on 24 July 2022.
 The Modular Space Station Experiment Module II would be called Mengtian, code MT. Mengtian was successfully launched on 31 October 2022.
 The separate space telescope module would be called Xuntian, code XT (telescope), receiving the previously intended name for the Experiment Module II. Launch is planned for 2024.

Purpose and mission
According to CMSA, which operates the space station, the purpose and mission of Tiangong is to develop and gain experience in spacecraft rendezvous technology, permanent human operations in orbit, long-term autonomous spaceflight of the space station, regenerative life support technology and autonomous cargo and fuel supply technology. It will also serve the platform for the next-generation orbit transportation vehicles, scientific and practical applications at large-scale in orbit, and technology for future deep space exploration.

CMSA also encourages commercial activities led by the private sector and hopes their involvement could bring cost-effective aerospace innovations. Space tourism at the space station is also considered.

Scientific research 
The space station will have 23 experimental racks in an enclosed, pressurized environment. There will also be platforms for exposed experiments; 22 and 30 on the Wentian and Mengtian laboratory modules, respectively. Over 1,000 experiments are tentatively approved by CMSA, and scheduled to be conducted on the space station.

Agriculture in microgravity was explored with cultivation of rice and Arabidopsis thaliana as sustainable food sources for long-term spaceflight.

The programmed experiment equipment racks for the three modules as of June 2016 were:
 Space life sciences and biotechnology
 Ecology Science Experiment Rack (ESER)
 Biotechnology Experiment Rack (BER)
 Science Glove-box and Refrigerator Rack (SGRR)
 Microgravity fluid physics and combustion
 Fluids Physics Experiment Rack (FPER)
 Two-phase System Experiment Rack (TSER)
 Combustion Experiment Rack (CER)
 Material science in space
 Material Furnace Experiment Rack (MFER)
 Container-less Material Experiment Rack (CMER)
 Fundamental Physics in Microgravity
 Cold Atom Experiment Rack (CAER)
 High-precision Time-Frequency Rack (HTFR)
 Multipurpose Facilities
 High Micro-gravity Level Rack (HMGR)
 Varying-Gravity Experiment Rack (VGER)
 Modularized Experiment Rack (RACK)

Education and cultural outreach 
The space station features space lectures and popular science experiments to educate, motivate and inspire the younger Chinese generation and world audience in science and technology. Each lecture is concluded with a Question-and-Answer (Q&A) session with school children's questions from classrooms across China. The first and second Tiangong space lesson was conducted in December 2021 and March 2022, as a part of the Shenzhou 13 mission. This tradition continued with the Shenzhou 14.

The CSSARC is the Amateur Radio payload for the Chinese Space Station, proposed by the Chinese Radio Amateurs Club (CRAC), Aerospace System Engineering Research Institute of Shanghai (ASES) and Harbin Institute of Technology (HIT). The payload will provide resources for radio amateurs worldwide to contact onboard astronauts or communicate with each other, aim to inspire students to take interests and careers in science, technology, engineering, and math, and encourage more people to get interested in amateur radio.

The first phase of the payload is capable of providing the following functions utilizing the VHF/UHF amateur radio band:

 V/V or U/U crew voice
 V/U or U/V FM repeater
 V/V or U/U 1k2 AFSK digipeater
 V/V or U/U SSTV or digital image

Structure 

The space station is a third-generation modular space station. First-generation space stations, such as early Salyut, Almaz, and Skylab, were single-piece stations and not designed for resupply. Second generation Salyut 6 and 7, and Tiangong 1 and 2 stations, are designed for mid-mission resupply. Third-generation stations, such as Mir and the International Space Station, are modular space stations, assembled in orbit from pieces launched separately. Modular design can greatly improve reliability, reduce costs, shorten development cycles, and meet diversified task requirements.

Modules 
The initial target configuration for the end of 2022 consists of three modules, which may be expanded to six in the future.

The Tianhe Core Cabin Module (CCM) provides life support and living quarters for three crew members and provides guidance, navigation, and orientation control for the station. The module also provides the station's power, propulsion, and life support systems. The module consists of three sections: living quarters, a service section, and a docking hub. The living quarters will contain a kitchen and toilet, fire control equipment, atmospheric processing and control equipment, computers, scientific apparatus, communications equipment to send and receive communications via ground control in Beijing, and other equipment.

In 2018 full-scale mockup of CCM was publicly presented at China International Aviation & Aerospace Exhibition in Zhuhai. The video from CMSA revealed that two of these core modules have been built. Artist impressions have also depicted the two core modules docked together to enlarge the overall station.

The first of two Laboratory Cabin Modules (LCM), Wentian, provides additional avionics, propulsion, and life support systems as backup functions for the CCM. The Wentian is also fitted with an independent airlock cabin to serve as the main entry-exit point for extravehicular activities (EVA), replacing the Tianhe docking hub. For the scientific payload, the LCM is equipped with multiple internal science racks and 22 payload adapters on the exterior for various types of experiments. Aside from scientific equipment, the module features three additional living quarters designed for short-term stay, which will be used during crew rotation. Wentian was launched and docked with the Tianhe on 24 July 2022. 

The second LCM, Mengtian, was launched on 31 October 2022. The Mengtian module is equipped with expanded in-orbit experiment capacity. The module is divided into multiple sections, including the pressurized crew working compartment, the unpressurized cargo section, the cargo airlock/on-orbit release mechanism, as well as the control module section featuring external experiment adapters, a communication antenna, and two solar arrays. In total, it carries 13 experimental racks and 37 external payload adapters. The cargo airlock is specifically designed for conveying payloads from inside the station to the exterior. 

Both LCMs provide a pressurized environment for researchers to conduct science experiments in freefall or microgravity which could not be conducted on Earth for more than a few minutes. Experiments can also be placed on the outside of the modules for exposure to the space environment, cosmic rays, vacuum, and solar winds. Overall, Wentian prioritizes life science, while the  Mengtian focus on microgravity experiments.

The axial port of the LCMs is fitted with rendezvous equipment for docking at the axial port of the CCM. A mechanical arm called the indexing robotic arm, externally resembling the Lyappa arm used on the Mir space station, moves Wentian LCM to the starboard side, and the Mengtian LCM module to a port-side port of the CCM. The Indexing robot arms differentiate from the Lyappa arm as they are used when docking is needed in the same plane, while the Lyappa arm controls the pitch of the spacecraft to re-dock it at a different plane. The Chinarm on the Tianhe module can be used as a backup for docking relocation.

Systems

Communication 
The real-time communications, including live audio and video links, are provided by the Tianlian II series of data relay satellites. A constellation of three satellites was launched into geostationary orbits, providing communication and data support for the station.

Docking 
Tiangong is fitted with the Chinese Docking Mechanism used by Shenzhou spacecraft and previous Tiangong prototypes. The Chinese docking mechanism is based on the Russian APAS-89/APAS-95 system. Despite NASA describing it as a "clone" to APAS, there have been contradictory claims on the compatibility of the Chinese system with both current and future docking mechanisms on the ISS, which are also based on APAS. The androgynous variant has a mass of 310 kg and the non-androgynous variant has a mass of 200 kg.

The Chinese Docking Mechanism was used for the first time on Shenzhou 8 and Tiangong 1 space stations and will be used on future Chinese space stations and with future CMSA cargo resupply vehicles.

Power supply 
Electrical power is provided by two steerable solar power arrays on each module, which use gallium arsenide photovoltaic cells to convert sunlight into electricity. Energy is stored to power the station when it passes into the Earth's shadow. Resupply spacecraft will replenish fuel for the station's propulsion engines for station keeping, to counter the effects of atmospheric drag. The solar arrays are designed to last up to 15 years.

Propulsion 
Tiangong space station is fitted with conventional chemical propulsion and ion thrusters to adjust and maintain the station's orbit. Four Hall-effect thrusters are mounted on the hull of Tianhe core module. The development of the Hall-effect thrusters is considered a sensitive topic in China, with scientists "working to improve the technology without attracting attention". Hall-effect thrusters are created with manned mission safety in mind with effort to prevent erosion and damage caused by the accelerated ion particles.

A magnetic field and specially designed ceramic shield were created to repel damaging particles and maintain the integrity of the thrusters. According to a report by the Chinese Academy of Sciences, the ion drive used on Tiangong ran continuously for 8,240 hours without a glitch during the testing phase, indicating its suitability for Tiangong's designated 15-year lifespan. These are the world's first Hall thrusters to be used on a human-rated mission.

Robotic arms 
The Tiangong station features five robotic arms. The longest one is the 10-meter-long, ISS Canadian-style SSRMS robotic arm, nicknamed Chinarm, mounted on the Tianhe core module.

The Wentian arm is primarily used to transfer extravehicular experiments and other hardware outside the station during astronaut EVAs. A dual-arm connector is installed on the Chinarm, providing it the capability to link with the  Wentian robotic arm, extending its reach and weight-carrying limits. 

The Mengtian module carries a payload release mechanism, installed to assist in cargo transfer. The robotic arm can retrieve experiments from the cargo airlock, then install them onto the external adapters fitted on the module exterior. It can also be used to launch microsatellites.

Two Indexing robotic arms are fitted on top of docking ports for the two laboratory modules to help relocate them during construction.

Co-orbit modules

Construction

Planning 
In 2011, it was announced that the future space station was planned to be assembled from 2020 to 2022. By 2013, the space station's core module was planned to be launched earlier, in 2018, followed by the first laboratory module in 2020, and a second in 2022. By 2018, it was reported that this had slipped to 2020–2023. In February 2020, a total of 11 launches were planned for the whole construction phase, beginning in 2021. In 2021, it was reported China National Space Administration planned to complete the construction of the space station in 2022.

Tiangong modules are self-contained and pre-assembled, in contrast to the US Orbital Segment of the ISS, which required spacewalking to interconnect cables, piping, and structural elements manually. The assembly method of the station can be compared with the Soviet-Russian Mir space station and the Russian orbital segment of the International Space Station, making China the second nation to develop and use automatic rendezvous and docking for modular space station construction. The technologies in the construction are derived from decades of Chinese manned spaceflight experiences, including those gained from Tiangong-1 and Tiangong-2 prototypes, as well as the purchase of aerospace technology from Russia in the early 1990s. A representative of the Chinese crewed space program stated that around 2000, China and Russia were engaged in technological exchanges regarding the development of a docking mechanism used for space stations. Deputy Chief Designer, Huang Weifen, stated that near the end of 2009, China Manned Space Agency (CMSA) began to train astronauts on how to dock spacecraft.

In accordance to the plan, by the end of 2022, the fully assembled Tiangong space station had three 22 metric-ton modules in a basic T-shape. With the modular design, the Tiangong space station can be further expanded into six modules prospectively enabling for more astronaut participation in the future.

Assembly 

The construction of the Chinese Space Station officially began in April 2021. The planned 11 missions include three module launches, four crewed missions, and four autonomous cargo flights. On 29 April 2021, the first component of the station, Tianhe core module, was launched to the orbit aboard the Long March 5B rocket from Wenchang Spacecraft Launch Site. On 29 May 2021, Tianzhou 2 autonomous cargo spacecraft was launched to the Tianhe core module in preparation for the Shenzhou 12 crew, who will be responsible for testing Tianhes various systems and preparing for future operations. On 17 June 2021, Shenzhou 12 team docked with the space station, marking them the first visitors to the Tiangong station. The first crew mission began the examination of the core module and verification of key technologies. On 4 July 2021, Liu Boming and Tang Hongbo began their first spacewalk in upgraded Chinese Feitian spacesuits, outfitting the space stations with extravehicular activity (EVA) equipment, such as foot restraints and the standing platform for Chinarm. Shenzhou 12 commander Nie Haisheng stayed inside the station and tested the robotic arm movements. Liu Boming and Nie Haisheng completed the second spacewalk on 20 August 2021 and installed various devices outside of the station, including a thermal control system, a panoramic camera, and other equipment. On 16 September 2021, the Shenzhou 12 crew entered the returning spacecraft and undocked from Tianhe. Before leaving the orbit, the crew performed various radial rendezvous (R-Bar) maneuvers to circumnavigate around the space station. They tested the guidance system and recorded lighting conditions while approaching the Tianhe from different angles. The crew landed in the Gobi Desert of Inner Mongolia on the same day. Tianzhou 3 cargo spacecraft, which arrived at the launch facility a month earlier, was immediately rolled out onto the launch pad for the next supply mission.

On 20 September 2021, Tianzhou 3 autonomous freighter was launched from the Wenchang Satellite Launch Center in preparation for the arrival of Shenzhou 13 crew. The Shenzhou 13 was the first six-month mission on the Tiangong station, whereas previous Shenzhou 12 was only three months in length. The Shenzhou 13 docked with the space station on 15 October 2021. Missions for the Shenzhou 13 crew included orbit experiments, spacewalks, and preparations for the station's future expansion. On 7 November 2021, Shenzhou 13 crew Zhai Zhigang and Wang Yaping conducted the first spacewalks to test the next-generation EVA suit and robotic Chinarm, making Wang Yaping China's first female spacewalker. One of the missions in the 6.5-hour extravehicular activity was to install a dual-arm connector to the 10-meter-long robotic arm. The connector can provide the capability for Chinarm to extend in length with another 5-meter-long segment mounted on the Wentian module that will arrive in 2022. According to Gao Shen of the China Academy of Space Technology (CAST), the combined 15-meter Chinarm will have greater range and weight-carrying capacity. During spacewalks, various preparations were performed on the robotic arm for manipulation and construction of future modules.

On 26 December 2021, Shenzhou 13 crew Zhai Zhigang and Ye Guangfu conducted the second spacewalk to install a panoramic camera, which will be used for space station monitoring and robotic arm observation. They also practiced various movements with the help of Chinarm controlled by the monitoring astronaut Wang Yaping inside the station. During the construction phase of the station in 2021, according to documents filed by China Manned Space Agency (CMSA) with the United Nations Office for Outer Space Affairs and reported by Reuters, the station had two "close encounters" with SpaceX's Starlink satellites on July 1 and October 21, with the station conducting evasive adjustment maneuvers. On 5 January 2022, Shenzhou 13 team used the 10-meter long Chinarm to relocate the Tianzhou 2 supply ship by 20 degrees before returning it to the original location. This maneuver was conducted to practice the procedures, equipment, and backup operation system needed for future module assembly. On January 13, the crew tested the emergency docking system by controlling the cargo spacecraft manually. In March 2022, Shenzhou 13 crew began the preparation to undock from the space station. The crew landed in China on 16 April 2022, after staying 182 days in the low-Earth orbit. Soon afterward, China launched Tianzhou 4 cargo spacecraft in preparation for the next crewed mission in May. The automated freighter docked with the space station on 9 May 2022, and carried vital maintenance equipment and a refrigerator for scientific experiment.

Beginning with the Shenzhou 14, China officially started the final construction phase for the space station, with three astronauts tasked to oversee the arrival of two labotorary modules in 2022. On 5 June 2022, Shenzhou 14 crew arrived at the space station, docking at the Earth-facing nadir port. Shenzhou 14 crew will begin the assembly for both Wentian and Mengtian modules, arriving in second half of the year. The crew installed carbon dioxide reduction system for the space station, tested Feitian spacesuits, and debugged Tianhe core module. On 19 July 2022, Tianzhou 3 was undocked from the station, making way for the arrival of the Wentian module. On 24 July 2022, the Wentian laboratory module was launched from the Wenchang space center and rendezvoused with the Tianhe core module on the same day. Wentian is the second module for the Tiangong space station, and the first laboratory cabin module (LCM). The module is equipped with an airlock cabin, which will become the primary entry-exit point for future EVAs. The module also feature backup avionics, propulsion, and life support systems, improving Tiangong space station's operational redundancy. On 2 September 2022, the crew member Chen Dong and Liu Yang performed their first spacewalk from the new Wentian airlock, installing and adjusting various external equipment as well as testing emergency return procedures. On 17 September 2022, astronauts Chen Dong and Cai Xuzhe performed the second spacewalk, installing external pumps and verified emergency rescue capability. On 30 September 2022, all crew members worked in coordination, moving the Wentian module from the forward port to the starboard lateral docking port, which is its planned permanent location on 30 September 2022 at 04:44 UTC. The relocation process was largely automated with the assistance of the Indexing robotic arm. In October 2022, CMSA prepared to launch the third and final module, Mengtian, to complete the construction for the Tiangong space station.

On 31 October 2022, Mengtian module was launched from the Wenchang space center, and docked with the station 13 hours later. The assembly of the Mengtian marks the final step in the 1.5-year construction process. According to China Academy of Space Technology, the rendezvous and docking process for Mengtian was conducted expeditiously, as then L-shaped Tiangong station consumed large amount of energy to stay oriented in its asymmetrical arrangement. On 3 November 2022, Mengtian was relocated autonomously from the forward docking port to port-side lateral docking port via Indexing robotic arm, and successfully berthed at its planned permanent location with Tianhe module at 01:32UTC (9:32BJT), forming a T-shape. Subsequently, CMSA announced the construction of the Tiangong space station is officially complete. Designer of Mengtian module, Li Guangxing, explained the space station was maneuvered to a special position, utilizing the Earth's gravity to help stabilized the docking process. At 07:12UTC, The Shenzhou 14 crew entered the Mengtian module. On 10 November 2022, Tianzhou 4 cargo spacecraft undocked from the Tiangong, and Tianzhou 5 was prepared to launch on the same day. Tianzhou 5 was launched on 12 November 2022, carrying supplies, experiments, and microsatellites to the space station. It also contained gifts for China's first crew handover ceremony in orbit. The completed station had extra capacity for expanded crew activities and living space for six, allowing crew rotation. On 29 November 2022, the Shenzhou 15 crew Fei Junlong, Deng Qingming, and Zhang Lu was launched to the space station. The crew spent one week together for handover and verification for sustainable six-man operations. With the crew rotation and contentious operation, China commenced its permanent space presence.

 Expansion 
According to CMSA, the Tiangong space station is expected to be expanded from three to six modules, with improved versions of the Tianhe, Wentian, and Mengtian modules. 

According to Wang Xiang, commander of the space station system at the China Academy of Space Technology (CAST), the potential next phase would be adding a new core module. “Following our current design, we can continue to launch an extension module to dock with the forward section of the space station, and the extension module can carry a new hub for docking with the subsequent space vehicles,” Wang told CCTV.

The Xuntian space telescope module is expected to launch in 2024.

International co-operation

China's incentive to build its own space station was amplified after US Congress prohibited NASA from any direct engagement & cooperation with CNSA thus effectively prohibiting any Chinese participation in the International Space Station (ISS) in 2011, although China, Russia and Europe mutually vowed intentions to maintain a cooperative and multilateral approach in space. Between 2007 and 2011, the space agencies of Russia, Europe, and China carried out the ground-based preparations in the Mars500 project, which complement the ISS-based preparations for a human mission to Mars.

Cooperation in the field of crewed space flight between the China Manned Space Agency (CMSA, formerly known as CMSEO) and the Italian Space Agency (ASI) was examined in 2011, and participation in the development of China crewed space stations and cooperation with China in the fields such as visiting astronauts, and scientific research was discussed.

An initial cooperative agreement with China National Space Administration and the Italian Space Agency was subsequently signed in November 2011, covering areas of collaboration within space transportation, telecommunications, Earth observation, etc. In 2019, an Italian experiment High Energy cosmic-Radiation Detection (HERD) was scheduled on board the Chinese station. Tiangong also involved cooperation from France, Sweden, and Russia.  

On 22 February 2017, the CMSA and the Italian Space Agency (ASI) signed an agreement to cooperate on long-term human spaceflight activities. The agreement holds importance due to Italy's leading position in the field of human spaceflight with regards to the creation and exploitation of the International Space Station (Node 2, Node 3, Columbus, Cupola, Leonardo, Raffaello, Donatello, PMM, etc.) and it signified Italy's increased anticipation in China's developing space station programme. The European Space Agency (ESA) started human spaceflight training with CMSA in 2017, with the ultimate goal of sending ESA astronauts to Tiangong. To prepare for the future missions, selected ESA astronauts lived together with their Chinese counterparts and engaged in training sessions such as splashes-down survival, language learning, and spacecraft operations. However, in January 2023, ESA announced that the agency will not send its astronauts to China’s space station due to political and financial reasons.

International experiments were selected by the CMSA and the United Nations Office for Outer Space Affairs (UNOOSA) in a UN session in 2019. 42 applications were submitted, and nine experiments were accepted. Some of the experiments are a continuation to the ones on Tiangong-2 such as POLAR-2, an experiment of researching Gamma-ray burst polarimetry, proposed by Switzerland, Poland, Germany and China. Canadian Professor Dr. Tricia Larose from the University of Oslo develops a cutting-edge cancer research experiment for the station. The 31-day experiment will test to see if weightlessness has a positive effect in stopping cancer growth. The High Energy Cosmic Ray Detector project is conducted by a 200 scientists team from Europe, mainland China, Hong Kong, and Taiwan. Under UNOOSA framework, Tiangong is also expected to host experiments from Belgium, France, Germany, India, Italy, Japan, Kenya, Mexico, the Netherlands, Peru, Russia, Saudi Arabia, and Spain, involving 23 institutions and 17 countries.

Regarding the participation of foreign astronauts, CMSA has repeatedly communicated its support for such proposals. During the press conference of the Shenzhou 12 mission, Zhou Jianping, the chief designer of China Manned Space Program explained that multiple countries had expressed their wishes to participate. He told journalists that the future participation of foreign astronauts "will be guaranteed". Ji Qiming, an assistant director at CMSA told reporters that he believes "in the near future, after the completion of the Chinese space station, we will see Chinese and foreign astronauts fly and work together." In October 2022, the station opened its selection process to Hong Kong and Macau, the two special administrative regions of China.

 Life aboard 
 Crew activities 
Astronauts on the Tiangong station follow China Standard Time (CST) for their daily schedule. The crew often wakes up around 7:00 and begins their daily conference with Mission Control in Beijing before starting work at 08:00 (00:00UTC). The crew will then follow their planned schedule until 21:00, after which they report their work process to Mission Control. At 13:30, astronauts enter their living quarters to take a nap, which typically takes an hour. The crew also has multiple breaks for eating and resting. The Tiangong station features a lighting scene function to simulate lighting conditions on Earth, including daylight, dusk, and night. As the station experiences 16 sunrises and sunsets per day in low Earth orbit, this function helps to avoid disruption to the crew's circadian rhythm.

The Tiangong space station is fitted with home automation functions, including remote-controlled appliances and a logistics management system. The crew can use their tablet computers to identify, locate, and organize items inside the station, as all items in the station are marked by QR codes. This will help ensure an orderly environment as more cargo arrives. The station possesses a Wi-Fi network for wireless connections and each astronaut wears a bone-conduction headphone and microphone for easy communication. Inter-device communication inside the station is completely wireless via the Wi-Fi network to avoid cord mess.

 Food and personal hygiene 

Meals consisting of 120 different types of food, selected based on astronauts' preferences, are stored aboard. Staples including shredded pork in garlic sauce, kung pao chicken, black pepper beef, yuxiang shredded pork, pickled cabbage, and beverages, including a variety of teas and juices, are resupplied by trips of the Tianzhou-class robotic cargo spacecraft. Fresh fruits and vegetables are stored in coolers. Huang Weifen, the chief astronaut trainer of CMSA, explains that most of the food is prepared to be solid, boneless, small-piece. Condiments such as pork sauce and Sichuan pepper sauce are used to compensate for the changes in the sense of taste in microgravity. The station is equipped with a small kitchen table for food preparation, a refrigerator, a water dispenser, and the first-ever microwave oven in spaceflight so that astronauts can "always have hot food whenever they need." Following the astronauts' feedback, larger supplies of vegetables were included since Tianzhou 4, making the variety of vegetable increased to 32.

The station's core module, Tianhe, provides the living quarters for the crew members, containing of three separate sleeping berths, a space toilet, shower facility, and gym equipment. Each berth features one small circular window, a headphone set, ventilation, and other amenities. Neuromuscular electrical stimulator is used to prevent muscle atrophy. The noise level in the working area is set at 58 decibels, while in the sleeping area, the noise is kept at 49 decibels. The ventilation system provides air circulation to the crew, with 0.08m/s wind speed for the working areas and 0.05m/s for the sleeping stations. Three additional living quarters for short-term stay are located in the Wentian laboratory module.

 Operations 
Tiangong is a permanently crewed station (from 5 June 2022), typically staffed with a crew of 3 people and can support up to 6 people. After the completion of the station in November 2022, it housed a crew of 6 people for the first time for 5 days during the crew rotation from Shenzhou 14 to Shenzhou 15 in December 2022. Operations will be controlled from the Beijing Aerospace Flight Control Center in China. To guarantee the safety of astronauts on board, a Long March 2F/G with a Shenzhou spacecraft will always be on standby for an emergency rescue mission.

Crewed mission

Initial crewed missions to Tiangong, including its first mission Shenzhou 12, which lasted the planned 90 days, used the Shenzhou spacecraft. Subsequent missions starting with Shenzhou 13 will last a planned 180 days, which became the normal duration of a mission cycle at Tiangong.

CMSA announced the testing of a next-generation crewed spacecraft to eventually replace Shenzhou. It is designed to carry astronauts to Tiangong and offer the capability for lunar exploration. China's next-generation crew carrier is reusable with a detachable heat shield built to handle higher-temperature returns through Earth's atmosphere. According to CMSA officials, the new capsule design is larger than the Shenzhou. The spacecraft is capable of carrying astronauts to the Moon, and can accommodate up to six to seven crew members at a time, three more astronauts than Shenzhou. The new crewed spacecraft has a cargo section that allows astronauts to bring cargo back to Earth, whereas the Tianzhou cargo resupply spacecraft is not designed to bring any cargo back to Earth.

 Cargo resupply Tianzhou''' (Heavenly Vessel), a modified derivative of the Tiangong-1 spacecraft, is used as robotic cargo spacecraft to resupply this station. The launch mass of Tianzhou is around 13,000 kg with a payload of around 6,000 kg. Launch, rendezvous and docking shall be fully autonomous, with mission control and crew used in override or monitoring roles. This system becomes very reliable with standardizations that provide significant cost benefits in repetitive routine operations. An automated approach could allow the assembly of modules orbiting other worlds prior to crewed missions.

 List of missions 

 All dates are UTC. Dates are the earliest possible dates and may change.
 Forward ports are at the front of the station according to its normal direction of travel and orientation (attitude). Aft is at the rear of the station, used by spacecraft to boost the station's orbit. Nadir is closest to the Earth, zenith is on top. Port is to the left if pointing one's feet towards the Earth and looking in the direction of travel; starboard to the right.

Key

 End of mission 
Tiangong is designed to be used for 10 years, though it could be extended to 15 years and will accommodate three astronauts. CMSA crewed spacecraft use deorbital burns to slow their velocity, resulting in their re-entry to the Earth's atmosphere. Vehicles carrying a crew have a heat shield which prevents the vehicle's destruction caused by aerodynamic heating upon contact with the Earth's atmosphere. The station itself has no heat-shield; however, small parts of space stations can reach the surface of the Earth, so uninhabited areas will be targeted for de-orbit manoeuvres.

 Visibility 
Similar to the ISS, the Tiangong space station can also be seen from earth with the naked eye. However, as it is smaller in size to the ISS, it will not be as bright as the ISS. The Tiangong space station can reach a brightness of at least -2.2 mag .

 In popular culture 
The Tiangong space station and the International Space Station are subjects in the 2013 feature film Gravity''.

Near the end of the Netflix original animated film Over the Moon (2020), a red dragon is depicted playing with Tiangong space station.

Notes

References

External links

 
 Complete Tiangong space station tracking location details from user location.
 China Space Station Amateur Radio Project (CSSARC) website - The amateur radio payload for Tiangong Space Station.

Space stations
2021 in China
Articles containing video clips